Kuala Selangor Municipal Council (Majlis Perbandaran Kuala Selangor) is the municipal council which administers Kuala Selangor. This agency is under the purview of Selangor state government.

History
The Kuala Selangor District Council was established in 1978 through the Selangor State Law Handbill 18/78. It is a conurbation of 5 local council: Kuala Selangor Local Council, Tanjong Karang Local Council, Batang Berjuntai (Bestari Jaya) Local Council, Ijok Local Council, Jeram Local Council.

Administration
As of 15th December 2021:
President:Rahilah binti Rahmat
Secretary: Muhamad Yusli Askandar
Head Of Treasury Department: Liliana Ahmad
Head Of Engineering Department: Ahmad Jamzuri Mujaini
Head Of Property Valuation And Management Department: Salinda Jamil
Head Of Licensing: Mohammed Zakir Husin Mohammed Zahid
Head Of Health And Environment Department: Jefriee Ab Manaf
Head Of Community Development Department: Mohd Razali Abdul Mayas
Head Of Management Services Department: Syawal Samin
Head Of Enforcement Development: Mohamad Lutfi Mislah Hudin
Head Of Landscape Department: Norazean Abdul Rahman
Head Of Building Control Department: Faezah Abdul Aziz
Head Of Planning and Development Department: Saidah Mahmud
Head Of Local Central Unit: Anuwaa Mohamad Jalani
Head Of Legal Unit: Nurul Saadah Wahab
Head Of Materials Procurement and Surveying Unit: Siti Nur Shafiqah Rahmad
Head Of Tourism Unit: Sazlan Hakeem Mazalan
Head Of Corporate And Public Relations Unit: Norrini Mohd Lazim
Head Of Information Technology Unit: Wan Nurulnasuha Wan Ab Aziz
Head Of Internal Audit Unit: Diana Sardi
Head Of Building Commissioner Unit: Muhammad Zul Fiqah Omar
ICT Security Officer: Wan Nurulnasuha Wan Ab Aziz

Councilors
2020-2022 Session:

Legislation

Acts
Akta Kerajaan Tempatan 1976 (Akta 171)
Akta Jalan, Parit dan Bangunan 1974 (Akta 133)
Akta Perancangan Bandar dan Desa 1976 (Akta 172)
Akta Perancangan Bandar dan Desa (Pindaan 1955) (Akta A933)
Akta Bangunan dan Harta Bersama (Penyelenggaraan dan Pengurusan) 2007 (Akta 663)
Akta Acara Kewangan 1957

Encantments
Enakman Hiburan dan Tempat-tempat Hiburan 1995 - termasuk pindaan 2001
Enakmen Hiburan dan Tempat-tempat Hiburan 1995-Peraturan-peraturan hiburan dan tempat-tempat hiburan (Selangor) 1996
Enakmen Mengawal Lembu - Kerbau 1971
Enakmen Kawasan Larangan Bagi Lembu - Kerbau 2001
Enakmen Kebebasan Maklumat (Negeri Selangor) 2011

Bylaws
Undang-undang Kecil (Mengkompaun Kesalahan-kesalahan) (Majlis Daerah Kuala Selangor) Kerajaan Tempatan 2005
Undang-undang Kecil Mengkompaun Kesalahan-kesalahan (Majlis Daerah Kuala Selangor) Jalan, Parit dan Bangunan 2005
Undang-undang Kecil Bangunan Seragam Selangor 1986
Undang-undang Kecil Pemungutan, Pembuangan dan Pelupusan Sampah Sarap (Majlis Daerah Kuala Selangor) 2007
Undang-undang Kecil Pengendalian Makanan (Majlis Daerah Kuala Selangor) 2007
Undang-undang Kecil Penjaja (Majlis Daerah Kuala Selangor) 2007
Undang-undang Kecil Pelesenan, Tred Perniagaan dan Perindustrian (Majlis Daerah Kuala Selangor) 2007
Undang-undang Kecil Iklan (Majlis Daerah Kuala Selangor) 2007
Undang-undang Kecil Pusat Kecantikan dan Penjagaan Kesihatan (Majlis Daerah Kuala Selangor)
Undang-undang Kecil Taman (Majlis Daerah Kuala Selangor) 2005
Undang-undang Kecil Iklan Pilihan Raya (Majlis Daerah Kuala Selangor) 2007
Undang-undang Kecil Mengenai Lesen Bersesama (Majlis Daerah Kuala Selangor) 199
Undang-undang Kecil Tandas Awam (Majlis Daerah Kuala Selangor) 1993
Undang-undang Kecil Vandalisme (Majlis Daerah Kuala Selangor) 2005
Undang-undang Kecil Tempat Letak Kereta-kereta Persendirian (Majlis Daerah Kuala Selangor) 2005
Perintah Pengangkutan Jalan (Peruntukan Tempat Letak Kereta (Majlis Daerah Kuala Selangor) 2007
Undang-undang Kecil Hotel  (Majlis Daerah Kuala Selangor) 2007
Undang-undang Kecil Perlesenan Anjing dan Rumah Pembiakan Anjing (Majlis Daerah Kuala Selangor) 2007
Undang-undang Kecil Kerja Di Jalan 1996
Undang-undang Kecil Tanah Perkuburan Islam (Majlis Daerah Kuala Selangor) 2005
Undang-undang Kecil Pelesenan Establisymen Makanan (Majlis Daerah Kuala Selangor) 2007
Undang-undang Kecil Kerja Tanah (Majlis Daerah Kuala Selangor) 2007
Undang-undang Kecil Pusat Sukan Persendirian (Majlis Daerah Kuala Selangor) 2007
Undang-undang Kecil Pusat Siber Dan Kafe Siber (Majlis Daerah Kuala Selangor) 2007
Undang-undang Kecil Krematorium (Majlis Daerah Kuala Selangor) 2007
Undang-undang Kecil Kolam Renang (Majlis Daerah Kuala Selangor) 2007
Undang-undang Kecil Pasar (Majlis Daerah Kuala Selangor) 2007

Rules, Orders, Regulations
Kaedah-kaedah Pekerja (Kelakuan dan Tatatertib) (Majlis Perbandaran Kuala Selangor) 1995
Perintah Tetap (Mesyuarat) (Majlis Perbandaran Kuala Selangor) 2007

References

External links 
MPKs official web site 

Local government in Selangor
Municipal councils in Malaysia